Shuangcheng North railway station is a railway station on the Hada Passenger Railway, in Shuangcheng District, Harbin, China.

Railway stations in Heilongjiang
Railway stations in Harbin